Porto Novo is a city in the island of Santo Antão, in Cape Verde. It is the seat of the Porto Novo municipality. At the 2010 census, the town had 9,310 inhabitants, which makes it the most populous settlement of the island.

Geography
Porto Novo is situated on the southeastern coast of Santo Antão, opposite the island São Vicente.

The city is divided into the following sections:

Abufador
Alto de Peixinho
Alto de São Tomé
Armazém
Bairro
Berlim
Branquinho
Chã de Camoca
Chã de Galinheira
Chã de Itália
Chã de Matinho
Covoada
Lombo Branco
Lombo de Meio
Praia de Topo
Ribeira Corujinho
São Tomé

Demography

History

Due to the aridity of the south coast of Santo Antão, settlement began relatively late. The city was initially a fishing village called Porto dos Carvoeiros. From only 30 dispersed buildings in 1901, it started growing in the 1910s. The port was inaugurated in 1962, and modernized in 2012-14. Before 1962, ships had to anchor in the bay of Alto Peixinho, and goods and passengers had to be brought ashore with small boats. The seat of the Porto Novo municipality created in 1962, it gradually became the largest urban settlement of the island. In 2005 the town of Porto Novo became a city.

Climate
Porto Novo has a desert climate. Its annual precipitation is 191 millimeters.

Transport
Since the latest modernization in 2014, the port of Porto Novo has 3 quays, 1 container park, 2 roll-on/roll-off ramps and a boat ramp. The total length of the quays is 268 m, and the maximum depth is 8 m. In 2017 134,141 metric tonnes of cargo and 301,813 passengers were handled (2017). There are 4 daily ferry connections from Porto Novo to Mindelo on São Vicente island.

The national road EN1-SA01 connects Porto Novo with Ribeira Grande, passing through the mountainous interior. The EN1-SA03 leads to Pombas along the east coast. The EN1-SA04 leads west to Ponte Sul. Since the closing of Agostinho Neto Airport, located in Ponta do Sol, there is no functioning airport on the island.

See also
List of cities in Cape Verde

References 

Cities in Cape Verde
Porto Novo Municipality
Municipal seats in Cape Verde
Geography of Santo Antão, Cape Verde
Populated coastal places in Cape Verde
Ports and harbours of Cape Verde